Mono Village is a community in Mono County, California. It is part of the Twin Lakes census-designated place.

It is currently a vacation destination that attracts hundreds of fishermen and outdoor enthusiasts every year. It is a full service destination with a camp ground, motel, cabins, grocery store, cafe, and other amenities. The main attraction is the two lakes known as Twin Lakes. Both of these lakes are filled with water from Robinson's Creek which flows down from the top of the mountains and ends at the Bridgeport Reservoir. It has some of the best trout fishing in California with record size fish being caught there. Both lakes have boat access and the Upper Twin allows for water sports. Mono Village is also a starting off point for many back country hiking trails. It sits on the back side of Yosemite which makes it attractive to expert backpackers and horseback tours.

References

Former settlements in Mono County, California
Former populated places in California
California placenames of Native American origin